The African Children's Educational Trust (A-CET) is a charity that helps to support education of African children through provision of scholarships and upgrading community elementary rural schools.  By 2012 A-CET had built or upgraded nine schools in Northern Ethiopia.  The charity was founded in 1997 by David Stables.

A-CET schools

Aderak Full Elementary School
A-CET upgraded a local school in the Tigray Region of Northern Ethiopia in 2005, it is now a full elementary school with eight grades.

Adibaekel Full Elementary School
This school was officially opened October 2010.

Adihana Full Elementary School
This school was completed in 2007.  It is a high quality junior school of four grades and can accommodate up to 400 students in one shift.

Dansa Full Elementary School
This school brings closer access and better long-term educational facilities to over 400 vulnerable rural students.

Gumselasa Full Elementary School
Originally two local built dark classrooms plus a shack with less than 100 students, this now has eight classrooms basically furnished, and is a full elementary school accommodating for over 400 youngsters from grades 1 to 8.

Hagere Selam Full Elementary School
Currently this school has grades 1–5 with planned grades up to 8 and a capacity of 500 students. Two thirds of the students at this school are female.

Adiba'ekel Full Elementary
Currently the school has only three grades. To continue any education children have to walk for well over an hour one-way to nearby Mynebri. This project started in December 2009 and will bring a proper school closer to a village community that really needs it to give their children a chance for a better future.  Scheduled opening is planned for 26 September 2010.

Abinet Church School
This residential school attached to St. Michael's Cathedral in Mek'ele, has about 112 youngsters, over a third of whom are blind or otherwise disabled, some doubly afflicted.

The church is their only refuge and offers them security and a life-times employment.  This project included seven dormitory blocks, a shower and separate latrine block plus a washing area.  From start to finish this took less than six months and included strong bunk beds and furnishings for all boys.

Zibane Albe School
The Ziban Albe (Hilltop) school in Hiwane was opened in April 2012.  This was the largest school project of the charity with 20 classrooms in five blocks. The school has a solar powered computer classroom.

References

Further reading
 Ethiopian Educational System
 A-CET report and accounts

External links
 

Development charities based in the United Kingdom
Education in Ethiopia
Organizations established in 1997